is a Japanese competitive swimmer who specializes in the 200-meter butterfly. In this event she won the world title in 2015 and bronze medals at the 2012 and 2016 Olympics.

Hoshi studied sports science at Waseda University in Tokyo, and enjoys shopping in her spare time. In 2006, she showed symptoms of Graves' disease, a condition that results in an overactive thyroid and frequent fatigue. Her thyroid gland was removed in November 2014, and in January 2015 she returned to competitions. Earlier in 2011 she was named Best Athlete of the Year by the Saitama Swimming Federation.

References

Japanese female butterfly swimmers
1990 births
Living people
Olympic swimmers of Japan
Swimmers at the 2008 Summer Olympics
Swimmers at the 2012 Summer Olympics
Swimmers at the 2016 Summer Olympics
Olympic bronze medalists for Japan
Olympic bronze medalists in swimming
Sportspeople from Saitama (city)
Waseda University alumni
Asian Games medalists in swimming
Swimmers at the 2010 Asian Games
Swimmers at the 2014 Asian Games
Medalists at the 2012 Summer Olympics
World Aquatics Championships medalists in swimming
Medalists at the 2016 Summer Olympics
Universiade medalists in swimming
Asian Games gold medalists for Japan
Asian Games silver medalists for Japan
Medalists at the 2010 Asian Games
Medalists at the 2014 Asian Games
Universiade silver medalists for Japan
Medalists at the 2011 Summer Universiade
21st-century Japanese women